Journeys to the Ends of the Earth is a 1999 television series produced by the Discovery Channel. Its two-year production made it the most expensive adventure travel series ever commissioned in Australia. The series was co-created by Stuart Scowcroft with series producer by Tim Toni and co-produced by David Adams. It was nominated for Best Documentary Series by the Australian Logie Awards.

List of episodes

 The Land of Fear (Tenere Desert, Niger)
 People of the Flame (Iran)
 Keepers of the Lost Ark (Ethiopia)
 Swahili Sinbads (Zanzibar and Kenya)
 The Forbidden Zone (Kamchatka)
 The Lost City of Gold (Peru)
 The Last Trail of Butch & Sundance (Bolivia)
 In Search of Jason & the Argonauts (Georgia, Azerbaijan)
 The Lost Buddhas of Afghanistan (Afghanistan)
 The Road to Shangri-La (Pakistan)
 The Mystery of the African Pharaohs (Sudan)
 The Lost World of the Khmer Rouge (Cambodia)
 The Ancient Chariots of Libya (Libya)

Discovery Channel original programming